The Times Journal of Cobleskill is a weekly newspaper published every Wednesday that covers news concerning Schoharie County of New York.  The Times Journal increased its price to $1.00 per paper, from $.75 in 2007, and has a website, also created in 2007.  The Journal, as it is also known, proclaims itself to be "The News of Schoharie County," although it is also read in other areas. It is currently owned by Jim Poole.

The beginning
The Times Journal was first published in 1877; at the time, it was known as the Cobleskill Herald.  Originally, the paper triumphed the Republican point of view.  Although Cobleskill and Schoharie County were heavily Democrat, the paper was successful.

After going through several owners, the Herald was bought by Erwin B. Hard in 1885.  Soon after purchasing the paper, Hard renamed it the Cobleskill Times.

Success and mergers
The paper went through several owners from 1885–1918, but continued to grow.  In 1919, Charles L. Ryder bought the paper.  Ryder, who had also published the Cherry Valley Gazette and the Sharon Springs Record, merged these papers with the Cobleskill Times.

In 1946 the Schoharie County Journal merged with the Cobleskill Times to form the Times Journal.

Today
The Journal was in the Ryder family until 1979, when Richard Sanford purchased it.  In July 1992, Jim Poole became owner and publisher of the paper.
The "Journal" is the main source of high school sports in the county, including teams from Middleburgh, Schoharie, Cobleskill, and Sharon Springs.  They also have a letter to the editor section which draws heavy debate from readers. 

Around November of every year, The Times Journal publishes Hometown Cooking, a collection of reader-submitted recipes. Notable examples of featured recipes include:
Special K Loaf
Pizza Soup
Peanut Butter Soup
Coca Cola Salad
Mountain Dew Apple Dumplings
Putting-on-the-Ritz Chicken Casserole
Diet Lemonade Chicken
Spaghetti Pie
Chocolate Mayonnaise Cake
Hot Dogs in Bourbon
Root Beer Pulled Chicken

Notes

Newspapers published in New York (state)
Newspapers established in 1877
Schoharie County, New York
Weekly newspapers published in the United States
1877 establishments in New York (state)